The 6th Alpine Division "Alpi Graie" was a short-lived division of the Royal Italian Army during World War II, which specialized in mountain warfare. The Alpini that formed the division are a highly decorated, elite mountain corps of the Italian Army comprising both infantry and artillery units. The divisions name Alpi Graie was chosen as most of its recruits came from the area of the Graian Alps.

History 
The division was raised in Ivrea on 15 November 1941 by activating reserve units. The division was deployed quickly to Montenegro - the first unit to leave was the 4th Alpini "Valley" Group on 14 December 1941. In March 1942 the full division had arrived at Danilovgrad in Montenegro and began to fight Yugoslav Partisans. The division saw heavy combat in the area of the Durmitor massif.

Meanwhile, the 3rd Alpini "Valley" Group had taken up garrison duties in occupied France in the area of Maurienne. It participated in the occupation of Vichy France by Axis forces during Case Anton.

In January 1943 the division was moved to Liguria for coastal defense duties. In the first days of September 1943 the division was moved to La Spezia to guard the Royal Italian Navy's base there. After the Armistice of Cassibile was announced on 8 September 1943 the division skirmished with invading German forces of the 65th Infantry Division to allow the Italian battle fleet to leave harbor and sail to ports under allied control. After the fleet had sailed the division dissolved on 10 September and most of its troops managed to evade the Germans and make for their homes.

Organization

Planned 
  6th Alpine Division "Alpi Graie", in Ivrea
 3rd Alpini "Valley" Group
  Alpini Battalion "Val Pellice"
  Alpini Battalion "Susa" (regular battalion, transferred from the 3rd Alpini Regiment/ 1st Alpine Division "Taurinense")
  Alpini Battalion "Val Cenischia"
 4th Alpini "Valley" Group
  Alpini Battalion "Val d’Orco"
  Alpini Battalion "Val Chisone"
  Alpini Battalion "Val Toce"
 6th Alpine Artillery Regiment
  Alpine Artillery Group "Val d’Orco"
  Alpine Artillery Group "Val d’Adige"
  Alpine Artillery Group "Val Chisone"
  XI Mixed Alpine Engineer Battalion
  Command Platoon
  1x Searchlight Section
  1x Telegraph and Radio Operators Company
  1x Engineer Company
 230th Transport Section
 310th Medical Section
 101st Supply Section
 420th Carabinieri Section
 422nd Carabinieri Section
 103rd Field Post Office

Montenegro 1942 
  6th Alpine Division "Alpi Graie"
 2nd Alpini "Valley" Group
  Alpini Battalion "Val Pescara"
  Alpini Battalion "Val Leogra"
 4th Alpini "Valley" Group
  Alpini Battalion "Val d’Orco"
  Alpini Battalion "Val Chisone"
  Alpini Battalion "Susa"
 6th Alpine Artillery Regiment
  Alpine Artillery Group "Val d’Orco" (replaced later by the Alpine Artillery Group "Val d’Adige")
  Alpine Artillery Group "Val Isonzo"

Italy spring 1943 
  6th Alpine Division "Alpi Graie"
 1st Alpini "Valley" Group
  Alpini Battalion "Val Fella"
  Alpini Battalion "Val Natisone"
  Alpini Battalion "Val Tagliamento"
 4th Alpini "Valley" Group
  Alpini Battalion "Val d’Orco"
  Alpini Battalion "Val Chisone"
  Alpini Battalion "Susa"
 6th Alpine Artillery Regiment
  Alpine Artillery Group "Val d’Adige"
  Alpine Artillery Group "Val Tagliamento"
  XI Mixed Alpine Engineer Battalion
 429th Transport Section
 430th Transport Section
 310th Medical Section
 101st Supply Section
 420th Carabinieri Section
 422nd Carabinieri Section
 103rd Field Post Office

Italy summer 1943 
On 1 May 1943 the 1st Alpini "Valley" Group left the division and was used to begin the process of reforming the destroyed 3rd Alpine Division "Julia" and 4th Alpine Division "Cuneense". Therefore the 6th Alpine Division once again changed its composition.

  6th Alpine Division "Alpi Graie"
 3rd Alpini "Valley" Group
  Alpini Battalion "Val Pellice"
  Alpini Battalion "Val Fassa"
  Alpini Battalion "Val Dora"
 4th Alpini "Valley" Group
  Alpini Battalion "Val d’Orco"
  Alpini Battalion "Val Chisone"
  Alpini Battalion "Susa"
 6th Alpine Artillery Regiment
  Alpine Artillery Group "Val d’Adige"
  Alpine Artillery Group "Val Chisone"
  XI Mixed Alpine Engineer Battalion
 13th Transport Section
 313th Medical Section
 19th Supply Section
 420th Carabinieri Section
 422nd Carabinieri Section
 103rd Field Post Office

Commanding officers 
The division's commanding officers were:

 Generale di Divisione Mario Girotti (15 November 1941 - 14 August 1943)
 Generale di Divisione Mario Gorlier (15 August 1943 - 10 September 1943)

CROWCASS 
The names of two men attached to the division can be found in the Central Registry of War Criminals and Security Suspects (CROWCASS) set up by the Anglo-American Supreme Headquarters Allied Expeditionary Force in 1945. The names can be found at: Central Registry of War Criminals and Security Suspects from the Kingdom of Italy.

References 

Alpini
Infantry divisions of Italy in World War II
Alpini divisions of Italy